Conjuring is an illustrated book by James Randi. Randi gives a detailed history of conjuring, more commonly known as magic, said to be the world's second oldest profession. It includes detailed portraits of conjurors, including the Harry Blackstone, Sr., Harry Blackstone, Jr., Harry Houdini and his entourage, Howard Thurston, Robert Heller, Joe Berg, and others.

Randi explains the history of famous magic tricks like the Rabbit from a hat, Bullet catch, and the Indian rope trick.

External links
As Life's Questions Get Harder, Magic Casts a Wider Spell The New York Times, June 13, 1994.

1992 non-fiction books
St. Martin's Press books
Books by James Randi
Magic books
Canadian non-fiction books